FC Spicul Fălești was a Moldovan football club based in Făleşti, Moldova. The club was founded in 1991 as FC Cristalul Fălești, and was dissolved in 1998. They played 4 seasons in the Moldovan National Division, the top division in Moldovan football.

Achievements
Divizia B
 Winners (1): 1996–97

References

External links
 FC Cristalul Făleşti at WeltFussballArchive 

Football clubs in Moldova
Defunct football clubs in Moldova
Association football clubs established in 1991
Association football clubs disestablished in 1998
1991 establishments in Moldova
1998 disestablishments in Moldova